Rob Schmitt (born August 13, 1983) is an American television personality who served as a co-host on Fox & Friends First. He stopped appearing on the network in August 2020 and currently hosts the nightly program Rob Schmitt Tonight on Newsmax.

Biography
Schmitt was born on August 13, 1983 and raised in Carmel, Indiana, the son of Farzaneh and Robert Schmitt (German descent). His mother is an immigrant from Iran. In 2005, Schmitt graduated with a B.A. in journalism from Indiana University. 

In 2008, he accepted a position as a weekend anchor at the ABC affiliate WPLG-TV in Miami, Florida. In 2011, he accepted a position as an anchor with CBS Los Angeles and in 2013, as an anchor at WNBC-TV in New York City. In 2016, he moved to Fox News where he served as co-host on Fox Nation with Carley Shimkus and worked as a co-anchor of Fox & Friends First with Jillian Mele. In August 2020, Schmitt ceased appearances on Fox and started appearing in Newsmax content.  His nightly program, Rob Schmitt Tonight, premiered on Newsmax on December 21, 2020. Schmitt resides in the East Hamptons.

References

1983 births
American television reporters and correspondents
Living people
People from Indiana
American television journalists
American people of Iranian descent
Fox News people
Newsmax TV people
Indiana University alumni
People from Carmel, Indiana
21st-century American journalists